The Chaser's Age of Terror Variety Hour was a touring stage show by Australian comedian team The Chaser. It was produced by Laughing Stock and was the second stage show the Chaser team have produced.

Production 
The Chaser were originally formed by Charles Firth, Dominic Knight, Craig Reucassel, and Julian Morrow, and in 1999, they ran a fortnightly newspaper entitled The Chaser. Since then, they were joined by Chas Licciardello, Andrew Hansen, and Chris Taylor, who helped them with the satirical publication. Through the help of Andrew Denton, an ABC personality, the Chaser team produced various shows for the ABC since 2001, most notably The Chaser's War on Everything.

It was revealed on 4 December 2007, that The Chaser would not be continuing on with a third season of the War on Everything in the first half of 2008. They would be performing a new stage production entitled The Chaser's Age of Terror Variety Hour. The show's title comes from a working title used in the early production of the War on Everything, which was The Age of Terror Variety Hour. The show ran between March and July 2008. It stars Andrew Hansen, Dominic Knight, Chas Licciardello, Julian Morrow, and Craig Reucassel. As for the other members of the Chaser, Charles Firth had left the group, and Chris Taylor was not performing in the show as he was writing a new television series for the ABC.

The Chaser's Age of Terror Variety Hour was the second stage show produced by The Chaser, the first being Cirque du Chaser, which was performed in 2005 and was highly successful. The show was produced and presented by the small stage company "Laughing Stock", which also produced and presented Cirque du Chaser. The Age of Terror Variety Hour was made in the same format, with sketches, songs, presentations, and interactive audience segments. The tour covered Adelaide, Ballarat, Brisbane, Canberra, Cairns, Darwin, Geelong, Hobart, Launceston, Melbourne, Newcastle, Parramatta, Perth, Sydney, and Townsville. Tickets for the show went on sale on 10 December 2007 for all shows except for the Melbourne shows, which went on sale  on 12 December 2007.

Performances
The Chaser team performed the show at the following places and dates:

The Show 
Some segments were:

Anna Coren Segue Challenge: Hansen and Licciardello are challenged by members of audience to link two subjects together in a segue.
Frank Forde: The Musical: In a parody of Keating!, The Chaser performed a short musical based upon the life of Frank Forde, known for being Australia's shortest serving Prime Minister, having a term of only eight days. Hansen portrayed Forde, with the rest of The Chaser playing various other members of parliament.

See also

References

External links
Bookings and information on The Chaser's Age of Terror Variety Hour

The Chaser
2008 in theatre